Municipal Theatre of Tacna is a teatre located in the center of Tacna, Peru.

History
It was built in 1870 by the Spanish engineer Constantine Martinez del Pino, and inaugurated by President Jose Antonio de Pezet in 1871.

The theatre was declared a historic and artistic monument in 1972.

Location
It sits in front of the MacLean Plaza.

Architecture
The two-story building exhibits a facade made entirely of quarried stone.

Paintings
In its main hall, many valuable paintings are displayed, that show illustrious Tacna natives such as the poet Federico Barreto, the painter Francisco Laso, and the historian Modesto Molina.

References
Notes

 i peru (2014), "Informacion de Tacna."

Theatres in Peru
Buildings and structures in Tacna Region